Leonardo Iorlano (born January 6, 1986 in Santa Fe) is an Argentine footballer playing for Camioneros Argentinos in Torneo Argentino B.

Career
After playing 11 years with the youth teams of his hometown club Unión de Santa Fe, in 2005 he moved to Europe where he first played one season in Serbia with FK Radnički Niš. Then he moved to Greece where he played with Paniliakos F.C. In 2007, he moved to Italy where, after training with Foligno, he signed with A.S.G. Nocerina. He also hold Italian citizenship.  In January 2009 he has signed a contract with Chilean club Cobreloa after coach Marcelo Trobbiani insisted on his signing. Next, he moved to Paraguay where he played for second-level side General Caballero.

He returned to Argentina and initially played with Altos Chipión from Belgrano.  In 2012, he played with Gimnasia y Esgrima in 2011–12 Torneo Argentino A. The following season, he played in fourth level with Defensores de Cambaceres. In January 2014 he joined Atenas de Río Cuarto. Then he played in Argentino B with Deportivo Aguilares.  In May 2015, coming from Sarmiento de Leones, he signed with Sportivo Villa Cubas. He played with Villa Cubas in Argentino B till end of 2016 when they ended up relegated.

References

External sources
 
 
 Profile at Srbijafudbal.
 Interview with career story at ElLitoral. 

Living people
1986 births
Footballers from Santa Fe, Argentina
Argentine footballers
Argentine expatriate footballers
Unión de Santa Fe footballers
FK Radnički Niš players
Serbian First League players
Expatriate footballers in Serbia
Paniliakos F.C. players
Expatriate footballers in Greece
Expatriate footballers in Italy
Cobreloa footballers
Expatriate footballers in Chile
Chilean Primera División players
General Caballero Sport Club footballers
Expatriate footballers in Paraguay
Gimnasia y Esgrima de Concepción del Uruguay footballers
Argentine Primera División players
Defensores de Cambaceres footballers
Primera Nacional players
Association football forwards
Argentine expatriate sportspeople in Serbia
Argentine expatriate sportspeople in Greece
Argentine expatriate sportspeople in Italy
Argentine expatriate sportspeople in Chile
Argentine expatriate sportspeople in Paraguay